The 1999 WNBA season was the third season for the New York Liberty. The Liberty hosted the first WNBA All-Star Game.

Offseason

WNBA Draft

Regular season

Season standings

Season Schedule

Player stats
Note: GP= Games played; REB= Rebounds; AST= Assists; STL = Steals; BLK = Blocks; PTS = Points; AVG = Average

Playoffs

Awards and honors
Teresa Weatherspoon, Guard, New York Liberty, All-WNBA Second Team

References

New York Liberty seasons
New York
New York Liberty
Eastern Conference (WNBA) championship seasons